St. Oscar Romero Catholic High School is a high school located in the Callingwood North neighbourhood in west Edmonton, Alberta, Canada.  It is operated by Edmonton's Catholic School System.  It is the Edmonton Catholic System's newest high school and is located next to the Jamie Platz YMCA, Callingwood Twin Arenas, and Edmonton Public Library's Lois Hole library.  The school is the first fully Wi-Fi high school in Edmonton.

The school opened in 2004 with the name Archbishop Oscar Romero High School, and has been renamed twice as the sainthood of Óscar Romero progressed. The school became Blessed Oscar Romero High School in 2015 when Romero was beatified, and gained its current name in 2018 after his canonization.

Extracurricular activities
The school offers a wide variety of extracurricular activities.
Clubs/Teams offered include:

 Choir
 Ski Club
 Travel Club
 Volleyball
 Basketball
 Soccer
 Swim Team
 Golf
 Cross Country
 Track & Field
 Curling Team
 Student Leadership Team
 Yearbook Club
 Drama Club
 Sign Language Club
 Social Justice & Environment Club
FROG - (Fully Rely on God)
 Tech Club

References

High schools in Edmonton
Catholic secondary schools in Alberta
Educational institutions established in 2004
2004 establishments in Alberta